Adjodol (Arabic: أجودول) is a village in the Haraze Al Biar Department of Chad. It lies along the road southwest of Massakory, 28 kilometres northeast of Massaguet.

References

Hadjer-Lamis Region
Populated places in Chad